The  is a railway line in Fukuoka Prefecture, Japan, connecting Kurosaki-Ekimae in Kitakyushu with Chikuhō-Nōgata Station in Nōgata, operated by . The line does not have an official name. The company and the line is also called . The company is a subsidiary of Nishi-Nippon Railroad (Nishitetsu), founded in 1951. The line originally had a through service with the Nishitetsu Kitakyushu Line, a tram line closed in 2000. Because of this, the Chikutetsu Line only uses tram vehicles. However, the line is legally classified as a railway under Railway Business Act, not a tramway under Tram Act, and the line does not share any segments with public roads.

Station list

Rolling stock
The Chikuhō Electric Railroad operates the following fleet of tramcars.

 2000 series 3-car articulated EMUs
 3000 series 2-car articulated EMUs
 5000 series 3-car articulated low-floor tramcars

2000 series
The 2000 series sets were purchased from Nishitetsu and rebuilt as three-car articulated units with four bogies.

, three of the original seven 2000 series sets (2002, 2003, 2006) remained in operation. Each car was finished in a different colour livery as follows.

3000 series
Nine 3000 series sets were introduced between 1988 and 1996. , all nine 3000 series sets were in operation, numbered 3001 to 3009.

5000 series
The 5000 series is a 17.6 m long low-floor tramcar type with three articulated units mounted on two bogies. , three 5000 series sets were in operation, with a total of four sets scheduled to be in operation by March 2018.

Individual car histories are as follows.

Former rolling stock
 2100 series two-car articulated EMUs

History
The Chikuho Electric Railroad was founded 15 February 1951.

See also
List of railway companies in Japan
List of railway lines in Japan

References

External links 

  

Railway lines in Japan
Tram transport in Japan
Rail transport in Fukuoka Prefecture
600 V DC railway electrification
Standard gauge railways in Japan